This is a list of serial drama television series. A serial is a television show which has a continuous plot that unfolds in sequential episode-by-episode fashion. Serials are, more often than not, shows that possess narrative complexity. They typically follow many story arcs that span entire television seasons, or even in some cases, the entire run of the series.

#
12 Monkeys (2015 – 2018)
13 Reasons Why (2017 – 2020)
24 (2001 – 2010, 2014)
24: Legacy (2017)
2000 Malibu Road (1992)
3% (2016 – 2020)
The 4400 (2004 – 2007)
666 Park Avenue (2012 – 2013)
90210 (2008 – 2013)
The 100 (2014 – 2020)

A
The Act (2019)
The Affair (2014 – 2019)
Agents of S.H.I.E.L.D. (2013 – 2020)
Alcatraz (2012)
Alex Rider (2020 – present)
Almost Human (2013 – 2014)
Alias (2001 – 2006)
The Alienist (2018 – present)
Altered Carbon (2018 – 2020)
Akame ga Kill! (2014)
American Crime Story (2016 – present)
American Gods (2017 – present)
American Horror Story (2011 – present)
American Soul (2019 – present)
American Vandal (2017 – 2018)
The Americans (2013 – 2018)
Andromeda (2000 — 2005)
Anohana: The Flower We Saw That Day (2011)
Another Life (2019 – present)
Aquarius (2015 – 2016)
Arcane (2021 – present)
Arrow (2012 – 2020)
Ash vs Evil Dead (2015 – 2018)
Attack on Titan (2013 – present)
Awake (2012)

B
Babylon (2014)
Babylon Berlin (2017 – present)
Babylon 5 (1993 – 1998)
Baccano! (2007) 
Band of Brothers (2001)
Banshee (2013 – 2016)
Barry (2018 – present)
Bates Motel (2013 – 2017)
Battlestar Galactica (2004 – 2009)
Berserk (1997 – 1998)
Better Call Saul (2015 – 2022)
Beverly Hills, 90210 (1990 – 2000)
The Big C (2010 – 2013)
Big Little Lies (2017 – 2019)
Big Love (2006 – 2011)
Billions (2016 – present)
The Black Donnellys (2007)
Black Monday (2019 – present)
Black Sails (2014 – 2019)
The Blacklist (2013 – present)
Blindspot (2015 – 2020)
Blood+ (2005 – 2006)
Bloodline (2015 – 2017)
Blood of Zeus (2020 – present)
Boardwalk Empire (2010 – 2014)
Das Boot (2018 – present)
The Borgias (2011 – 2013)
Bosch (2014 – present)
Boss (2011 – 2012)
The Boys (2019 – present)
Brain Dead (2016)
Breaking Bad (2008 – 2013)
The Bridge (2013 – 2014)
Broadchurch (2013 – 2017)
Bridgerton (2021 – present)
Brotherhood (2006 - 2008)
Brothers & Sisters (2006 – 2011)
Buffy the Vampire Slayer

C
Canaan (2009)
Cane (2007)
Caprica (2010)
Carnival Row (2019 – 2019)
Carnivàle (2003 – 2005)
Castle Rock (2018 – 2019)
Castlevania (2017 – 2021)
Catch-22 (2019)
Catherine (2014 – present)
Catherine the Great (2015)
Central Park West (1995 – 1996)
el Chapo (TV series) (2017 - 2018)
Chernobyl (2019)
Claymore (2007)
The Client (1995 – 1996)
Cobra Kai (2018 – 2021)
Code Geass (2006 – 2008)
Code of a Killer (2015)
Codes of Conduct 
Colony (2016 - 2018)
The Comeback (2014)
Continuum (2012 – 2015)
Counterpart (2017 – 2019)
Courthouse (1995)
Cowboy Bebop (1998 – 1999)
Crash (2008 – 2009)
Crime Story (1986 – 1988)
Cross Ange (2014 – 2015)
The Crossing (2018)
The Crown (2016 – present)
Crusade (1999)

D
Dallas (1978 – 1991)
Dallas (2012 – 2014)
Damages (2007 – 2012)
Danganronpa: The Animation (2013)
Danganronpa 3: The End of Hope's Peak High School (2016)
Dark (2017 – 2020)
The Dark Crystal: Age of Resistance (2019)
Dark Matter (2015 - 2017)
Dawson's Creek (1998 – 2003)
Daybreak (2019)
The Dead Zone (2002 – 2007)
Deadwood (2004 – 2006)
Death Note (2006 – 2007)
Deep State (2018 – present)
Defying Gravity (2009)
Designated Survivor (2016 – present)
Desperate Housewives (2004 – 2012)
The Deuce (2017 – 2019)
Devs (2020)
Dexter (2006 – 2013)
Dirt (2007 – 2008)
Dirty John (2018 – present)
Dirty Sexy Money (2007 - 2009)
Dispatches From Elsewhere (2020 – present)
Dollhouse (2009 – 2010)
Dominion (2014 – 2015)
Downton Abbey (2010 – 2015)
Dracula (2020)
Dynasty (1981 – 1989)
Dynasty (2017 – present)
Dystopia (2021-

E
Eli Stone (2008 – 2009)
Elite (2018 – present)
Emergence (2019 – 2020)
Empire (2015 – 2020)
Euphoria (2019 – present)
The End of the F***ing World (2017 – 2019)
The Event (2010 – 2011)
Everwood (2002 – 2006)
Evil (2019 – present)
The Expanse (2015 – present)
The Exorcist (2016 – 2017)
Extant (2014 – 2015)

F

Falcon Crest (1981 – 1990)
The Falcon and the Winter Soldier (2021)
Falling Skies (2011 – 2015)
Fargo (2014 – present)
Farscape (1999 - 2003)
Fear the Walking Dead (2015 – present)
Feud (2017)
FlashForward (2009 – 2010)
The Following (2013 – 2015)
For All Mankind (2019 – present)
Frequency (2016 - 2017)
Friday Night Lights (2006 – 2011)
Fringe (2008 – 2013)
The Future Is Wild (2007 – 2008)

G
Game of Thrones (2011 – 2019)
Gavin & Stacey (2007 - 2010, 2019)
Gilmore Girls (2000 - 2007)
The Girl from Tomorrow (1991 - 1993)
GLOW (2017 – 2019)
Godless (2017)
Goliath (2016 – present)
Good Girls (2018 – present)
Good Omens (2019)
The Good Wife (2009 – 2016)
Gossip Girl (2007 – 2012)
Grey's Anatomy (2005 – present)
Gurren Lagann (2007)

H
Halt and Catch Fire (2014 – 2017)
The Handmaid's Tale (2017 – present)
Hannibal (2013 – 2015)
Harlots (2017 – 2019)
Harper's Island (2009)
Heartland (2007 – present)
Helix (2014 – 2015)
Hell on Wheels (2011 – 2016)
Heroes (2006 – 2010)
Heroes Reborn (2015 - 2016)
High Seas (2019 – present)
Highschool of the Dead (2010)
His Dark Materials (2019 – present)
Homeland (2011 – 2020)
Hostages (2013 – 2014)
House of Cards (2013 – 2018)
How to Get Away with Murder (2014 – 2020)
Humans (2015 – 2018)
Hunters (2020 – present)
Hyperion Bay (1998 – 1999)

I
In Treatment (2008 – 2010)
The Increasingly Poor Decisions of Todd Margaret (2010 – 2016)
Into the Badlands (2015 – 2019)
Inuyasha (2000 – 2004 + 2009 – 2010)
Invasion (2005 - 2006)
Invincible (2021 – present)
The I-Land (2019)

J
Jack Ryan (2018 – present)
Jericho (2006 – 2008)
Joan of Arcadia (2003 – 2005)
Justified (2010 – 2015)

K
Kabaneri of the Iron Fortress (2016 – 2019)
Kidding (2018 – 2020)
Kidnapped (2006 – 2007)
The Killing (2011 – 2014)
Killing Eve (2018 – present)
Killjoys (2015 - 2019)
Kill la Kill (2013 – 2014)
Kings (2009)
The Knick (2014 – 2015)
Knight Rider (1982 TV series) (1982 – 1986)
Knightfall (2017 – 2019)
Knots Landing (1979 – 1993)
Kyle XY (2006 – 2009)
Krypton (2018 – 2019)

L
The L Word (2004 – 2009)
Last Exile (2003 – 2011)
The Last Kingdom (2015 – present)
Last Resort (2012 – 2013)
The Last Ship (2014 – 2018)
The Leftovers (2014 – 2017)
The Legend of Korra (2012 – 2014)
Legion (2017 – 2019)
Lexx (1997 – 2002)
Life on Mars (U.K.) (2006 – 2007)
Life on Mars (U.S.) (2008 – 2009)
Lilyhammer (2012 – 2014)
Line of Duty (2012 – present)
Living With Yourself (2019)
Locke & Key (2020 – present)
Loki (2021 - present)
The Looming Tower (2018)
Lost (2004 – 2010)
Lovecraft Country (2020 – present)
The Lottery (2014)
Luck (2011 – 2012)

M
Mad Men (2007 – 2015)
The Magicians (2015 – 2020)
The Man in the High Castle (2015 – 2019)
Manhattan (2014 – 2015)
Manhunt: Unabomber (2017 – present)
Maniac (2018)
Manifest (2018 – present)
Marianne (2019)
Marvel's Agents of S.H.I.E.L.D. (2013 – 2020)
Marvel's Daredevil (2015 – 2018)
Marvel's Jessica Jones (2015 – 2019)
Marvel's The Punisher (2017 – 2019)
The Marvelous Mrs. Maisel (2017 – present)
Masters of Sex (2013 – 2016)
Masters of the Universe: Revelation (2021)
Mayans M.C. (2018 – present)
Medici (2016 – 2019)
Melrose Place (1992 – 1999)
Melrose Place (2009 – 2010)
The Messengers (2015)
Millennium (1996 – 1999)
Mindhunter (2017 – present)
Misfits (TV series) (2009 - 2013)
The Mist (2017)
Monster (2004 – 2005)
The Morning Show (2019 – present)
Mr. Robot (2015 – 2019)
Mrs. Fletcher (2019)
Murder One (1995 - 1997)

N
The Name of the Rose (2019)
Nashville (2012 – 2018)
Neon Genesis Evangelion (1995 – 1996)
The Newsroom (2012 – 2014)
The Night Of (2016)
Nikita (2010 – 2013)
The Nine (2006 – 2007)
Nip/Tuck (2003 – 2010)
Narcos (2015 – 2017)
Narcos: Mexico (2018 – present)
Nurse Jackie (2009 – 2015)
Nowhere Man (1995 - 1996)

O
The O.C. (2003 – 2007)
On Becoming a God in Central Florida (2019)
Once Upon a Time (2011 – 2018)
Once Upon a Time in Wonderland (2013 – 2014)
One Tree Hill (2003 – 2012)
Orange Is the New Black (2013 – 2019)
Origin (2018)
The Originals (2013 – 2018)
Orphan Black (2013 – 2017)
Our Friends in the North (1996)
Outlander (2014 – present)
The Outsider (2020)
Oz (1997 – 2003)
Ozark (2017 – present)
The OA (2016 – 2019)

P
Parenthood
Party of Five
Peaky Blinders
Penguindrum
Penny Dreadful
Pennyworth
Person of Interest
Persons Unknown
Picnic at Hanging Rock
The Playboy Club
Point Pleasant
Poldark
The Politician
Power
Preacher
Pretty Little Liars
Primal
Prison Break
Profit
Project Blue Book
Psycho-Pass
Puella Magi Madoka Magica
The Purge

Q
Queer as Folk (UK) (1999 – 2000)
Queer as Folk (US) (2000 – 2005)

R
The Rain
Ratchet
Ravenswood
Ray Donovan
Rectify
Reign
Rescue Me
Resurrection
The Returned
Reunion
Revenge
Revolution
The Riches
Ringer
Ripper Street
The River
Riverdale
Rome
Roswell
Roswell, New Mexico
The Royals
Rubicon
Russian Doll

S
Salem
Salvation
Scandal
Scream Queens
Secret Diary of a Call Girl
Secret Life of the American Teenager
Secrets & Lies
See
A Series of Unfortunate Events
Seven Seconds
Sharp Objects
The Shield
Show Me a Hero
The Sinner
Six Feet Under (2001-2005)
The Slap (Australia)
The Slap (U.S.)
Sleeper Cell
The Society
Sons of Anarchy
The Sopranos (1999-2007) 
Soul Food
Space: Above and Beyond
Spartacus
The Spy
Star Trek: Discovery
Star Trek: Picard
Star Wars: The Clone Wars
The Strain
Strange Angel
Stranger Things
Studio 60 on the Sunset Strip
Succession
Swamp Thing

T
Taken
Ten Days in the Valley
Terminator: The Sarah Connor Chronicles
Terra Nova
Terriers
That's Life
The Terror
This Is Us
Threshold
Titans
Todd McFarlane's Spawn
Tokyo Ghoul
Tokyo Magnitude 8.0
Top of the Lake
Treadstone
Treme
Triumph Over Evil
True Blood 
True Detective
The Tudors
Twin Peaks
Twisted
Tyrant
The Vampire Diaries
The Originals

U
Unbelievable (2019)
Under the Dome (2013 – 2015)
Underground (2016 – 2017)
Undone (2019 – present)

V
V (2009 – 2011)
V Wars (2019)
Valvrave the Liberator (2013)
The Vampire Diaries (2009 – 2017)
Vanished (2006)
Veronica Mars (2004 – 2019)
Victoria (2016 – 2019)
Vikings (2013 – present)

W
Waco (2018)
The Walking Dead (2010 – present)
WandaVision (2021)
Warehouse 13 (2009 – 2014)
Watchmen (2019)
Wayward Pines (2015 – 2016)
Weeds (2005 – 2012)
The West Wing (1999 – 2006)
Westworld (2016 – present)
The Whispers (2015)
The White Princess (2017)
The White Queen (2013)
The Widow (2019)
Wild Palms (1993)
The Wire  (2002 – 2008)
The Witcher (2019 – present)
Wolf Creek (2016 – 2017)
Wolf Hall (2015)
Wynonna Earp (2016 – present)

Y
Years and Years (2019)
Yellow Peppers (2010 – 2014)
Yellowstone (2018 - present)
You (2018 – present)
The Young Pope (2016)
The Young Warriors (2006)

Z
Z Nation (2014 – 2018)
Zero Hour (2013)

References

Serial